The Minister of State is an honorary title in Belgium. It is formally granted by the Belgian monarch, but on the initiative of the Belgian federal government. It is given on a personal basis, for life rather than for a specified period. The title is granted for exceptional merits, generally to senior politicians at the end of their party careers. It is not lost after a criminal conviction (Guy Spitaels, Willy Claes). Ministers of state are often former cabinet members or party leaders. Ministers of State advise the Sovereign in delicate situations, with moral authority but without formal competence. They are also members of the Crown Council of Belgium.

List of living ministers of state

Willy Claes – 2 December 1983
Philippe Busquin – 26 May 1992
Charles-Ferdinand Nothomb – 30 January 1995
Guy Verhofstadt – 30 January 1995
Louis Tobback – 30 January 1995
Annemie Neyts – 30 January 1995
Magda Aelvoet – 30 January 1995
Louis Michel – 30 January 1995
José Daras – 30 January 1995
Gérard Deprez – 30 January 1995
Herman De Croo – 3 June 1998
François-Xavier de Donnea – 17 July 1998
Mark Eyskens – 18 November 1998
Elio Di Rupo – 28 January 2002
Freddy Willockx – 28 January 2002
Raymond Langendries – 28 January 2002
Miet Smet – 28 January 2002
Patrick Dewael – 28 January 2002
Jos Geysels – 28 January 2002
Karel De Gucht – 28 January 2002
Herman Van Rompuy – 26 January 2004
Jaak Gabriëls – 26 January 2004
Charles Picqué – 26 January 2004
Philippe Monfils – 26 January 2004
Étienne Davignon – 26 January 2004
Johan Vande Lanotte – 30 January 2006
Frank Vandenbroucke – 24 November 2009
Melchior Wathelet – 7 December 2009
André Flahaut – 7 December 2009
Yves Leterme – 7 December 2011
Jacques van Ypersele de Strihou – 20 July 2013
Frans van Daele – 2 November 2017
Charles Michel – 31 October 2019

Former ministers of state

 
Honorary titles of Belgium